Eva Theresa Mylott (27 February 1875 – 20 March 1920) was an Australian contralto opera singer.

Early life
Eva Mylott was born in Tuross Head, New South Wales, Australia. Her parents, Patrick Mylott (1838-1899), an importer of wine and spirits and Mary Heffernan (1839-1931) (the daughter of Edmund and Honora Heffernan), were Irish Roman Catholics who settled in the Colony of New South Wales. Patrick was born 1838 in County Mayo, the son of Patrick Mylott and Mary McDermott. He arrived in 1861 aboard the John Masterman.
Mylott became a protégé of Dame Nellie Melba and in 1902, she went to England with her to pursue an opera career outside Australia.

Personal life
On 17 June 1917 in New York City, she married American businessman John Hutton Gibson (died ca. 1933); they had two sons: Hutton Gibson in 1918 and Alexis Mylott Gibson.

Mylott died in 1920, aged 45, in Chicago, after slipping in the shower and injuring her neck, leaving two-year-old Hutton and infant Alexis in the care of her husband, who died thirteen years later.

Legacy
Mylott is the paternal grandmother of the actor and film director Mel Gibson.

References

External links
Eva Mylott, from the official website of Tuross Head, NSW

1875 births
1920 deaths
19th-century Australian women opera singers
Accidental deaths from falls
Accidental deaths in Illinois
Australian contraltos
Australian emigrants to the United States
Australian people of Irish descent
Operatic contraltos
Singers from New South Wales
Gibson family